2010 Virginia Cavaliers baseball team represented the University of Virginia in the 2010 NCAA Division I baseball season.  The Cavaliers played their home games at Davenport Field. The team was coached by Brian O'Connor, leading his seventh season at Virginia.

The Cavaliers won the Atlantic Coast Conference Coastal Division. They went to the 2010 College World Series as the fifth overall seed, losing to Oklahoma in the super regional.

Personnel

Roster

Coaches

Schedule

Ranking movements

References

Virginia Cavaliers baseball seasons
Virginia
Virginia
Virgin